Steffensen may refer to:

Hans Christian Steffensen (1837–1912), Danish politician, jurist and speaker of the Landsting
Jens Olai Steffensen (1891–1961), Norwegian politician for the Labour Party
Johan Frederik Steffensen (1873–1961), Danish mathematician, statistician, and actuary
John Steffensen (born 1982), Australian athlete, who specialises in 200 and 400 metres
John Toralf Steffensen (1919–1996), Norwegian politician for the Labour Party
Lennart Steffensen (born 1977), Norwegian football midfielder
Peter Steffensen (born 1979), Danish badminton player
Steffen Olai Steffensen (1842 – ??), Norwegian politician for the Conservative Party
Wilhelm Steffensen (born 1889), Norwegian gymnast who competed in the 1920 Summer Olympics

See also
Steffen

Norwegian-language surnames
Danish-language surnames
Surnames from given names